Chilena strigula is a moth of the family Lasiocampidae first described by Francis Walker in 1865. It is found in India and Sri Lanka. Caterpillars are known to feed on Acacia species.

References

Moths of Asia
Moths described in 1865